Tsaava is a Georgian surname. Notable people with the surname include:
Grigol Tsaava (born 1962), Georgian former footballer
Londer Tsaava, Georgian politician

Surnames of Georgian origin
Georgian-language surnames
Surnames of Abkhazian origin